Manyatta Constituency is an electoral constituency in Kenya. It is one of four constituencies of Embu County. The constituency was established for the 1997 elections. According to the 2019 population census, Manyatta has a total population of 206,678 people.

Members of Parliament

Locations and wards

References 

Constituencies in Eastern Province (Kenya)
1997 establishments in Kenya
Constituencies established in 1997
Constituencies in Embu County